The second and final season of the Australian family drama Always Greener began airing on 8 September 2002 and concluded on 8 June 2003 with a total of 28 episodes.

Cast

Regular
John Howard as John Taylor
Anne Tenney as Liz Taylor
Michala Banas as Marissa Taylor
Daniel Bowden as Jason Taylor
Abe Forsythe as Campbell Todd
Natasha Lee as Kim Taylor
Scott Major as Tom Morgan
Caitlin McDougall as Sandra Todd
Bree Walters as Philippa Todd
Clayton Watson as Mickey Steele

Semi-Regular
Georgie Shew as Katy Turnball
Denise Roberts as Isabelle Turnball
Andrew Clarke as Derek Unn
Merridy Eastman as Eileen Unn
Nathaniel Dean as Patch
Peter Corbett as Bert Adams
Bree Desborough as Shelley Southall

Recurring
Steven Rooke as Nick Greenhill
Grant Bowler as Greg Steele (episodes 1–7)
Matt Passmore as Pete Jones (episodes 13–28)

Guest
Hamish Thompson as Bomber O'Casey
Lynette Curran as Connie Linguini
Alex Blias as Mark 'Skid' Pannas

Episodes

References

2002 Australian television seasons
2003 Australian television seasons